For the unreleased film by The KLF, see The KLF films.

White Room is a 1990 Canadian drama film written and directed by Patricia Rozema and starring Maurice Godin, Kate Nelligan and Sheila McCarthy. Ziggy Lorenc and Erika Ritter also have cameo appearances in the film as interviewers.

Premise
Norm is a confused young man who is drawn into events after witnessing the murder of rock star Madeleine X (Margot Kidder). Jane, a mysterious woman, meets Norm at Madeleine X's funeral, and Zelda, a quirky bohemian artist, helps Norm get a job and attempt to solve the murder.

Cast
 Kate Nelligan as Jane
 Maurice Godin as Norm
 Margot Kidder as Madelaine X
 Sheila McCarthy as Zelda
 Barbara Gordon as Mrs. Gentle
 Nicky Guadagni as The Narrator
 Erika Ritter as Radio Interviewer
 Les Rubie as Man with Cow
 Dwayne McLean as Attacker
 David Ferry as Record Executive

Home media
The movie was released in Canada on VHS by Alliance Releasing Home Video. In 2002, the film was released on DVD by Alliance Atlantis. The DVD contains a widescreen presentation, French and English audio tracks, and an audio commentary by the director.

Streaming
As of 2019 the film has been released online on Canada Media Fund's Encore+ YouTube channel.

External links

1990 films
1990s English-language films
English-language Canadian films
Canadian drama films
Films directed by Patricia Rozema
Films scored by Mark Korven
1990s Canadian films